An adversity quotient (AQ) is a score that measures the ability of a person to deal with adversities in their life. As per W Hidayat, the AQ also has an effect on the student's mathematics understandability. Hence, it is commonly known as the science of resilience. The term was coined by Paul Stoltz in 1997 in his book Adversity Quotient: Turning Obstacles Into Opportunities. To quantify the adversity quotient, Stoltz developed an assessment method called the Adversity Response Profile (ARP).

The AQ is one of the probable indicators of a person's success in life and is also primarily useful to predict attitude, mental stress, perseverance, longevity, learning, and response to changes in environment .

Bibliography
 Stoltz, P. (1997). Adversity quotient: Turning obstacles into opportunities. New York: Wiley, 
 Adversity Quotient @ Work: Make Everyday Challenges the Key to Your Success--Putting the Principles of AQ Into Action by Paul G. Stoltz, Ph.D. (Morrow, 2000), 
 Adversity Quotient at Work: Finding Your Hidden Capacity for Getting Things Done by Paul G. Stoltz, Ph.D. (Collins, 2001), ASIN: B000W25NPI

References

External links
 Peaklearning.com
 Researchgate.net

Psychological tests and scales